Ian Edwin Stewart (born Belfast, 10 September 1961) is a former footballer from  Northern Ireland.

Career
He played as winger for Queens Park Rangers, Newcastle United, Portsmouth and Aldershot in the 1980s, as well as Colchester United in their Football Conference/FA Trophy double in the 1991-92 season, scoring several important goals during the Trophy success in particular. He made his league debut for QPR as substitute against Blackburn Rovers in October 1980. On 17 November 1982 he scored his first international and Northern Ireland's winning goal versus that year's World Cup runners up, and reigning European Champions, West Germany in a European Championship qualifying match at Windsor Park, Belfast. One year later in the return game in Hamburg he created the winning goal for Norman Whiteside in another 1-0 win.

Stewart was a crowd favourite at QPR but moved to Newcastle United in the summer of 1985 and joined Portsmouth two years later. Stewart represented Northern Ireland in the 1986 Fifa World Cup in Mexico. He was the first British footballer to be endorsed by Nike. Today he works as a grassroots development officer for the Irish Football Association. He has a keen interest in music and puts on events around Northern Ireland.

Honours

Club
Queens Park Rangers
 Football League Second Division Winner (1): 1982–83

Colchester United
 Football Conference Winner (1): 1991–92

References

External links

Sporting Heroes profile

1961 births
Living people
Association footballers from Northern Ireland
Northern Ireland international footballers
Queens Park Rangers F.C. players
Newcastle United F.C. players
Portsmouth F.C. players
Aldershot F.C. players
Colchester United F.C. players
Association footballers from Belfast
1986 FIFA World Cup players
English Football League players
Association football forwards
Brentford F.C. players